The đàn tam thập lục (also called simply tam thập lục) is a Vietnamese hammered dulcimer with 36 metal strings.  It is used in various genres of traditional music and drama, as well as in modernized traditional music. The instrument is very similar to the Chinese yangqin.

External links
Đàn tam thập lục page

Hammered box zithers
Vietnamese musical instruments